The BYU Division of Continuing Education (DCE) is a division of Brigham Young University (BYU) that oversees continuing education programs.

History
Attempts at BYU to offer continuing education programs date back to Karl G. Maeser offering night classes to workers at the Provo Woolen Mills in 1876.  However night classes and other attempts to reach out to non-matriculated students were haphazard through the next few decades.

The Polysophical Society was organized in 1877 to give lectures open to the general public.  At first most of the lectures were given by students.  By 1903 the program was organized as the lyceum program with John C. Swensen as its director and most of the lectures were either by BYU faculty or by professors and lecturers invited from elsewhere.

The DCE as an organization began in 1921 when Franklin S. Harris, BYU's president, organized the Extension Division.  Lowry Nelson served as the first director.  Nelson believed that educational opportunity should not be limited to those who could formally attend colleges and universities in the standard campus format.  In 1946, Harold Glen Clark was made director of the extension division.  Clark oversaw a major expansion of the role of BYU and the expansion or creation of many of the programs that BYU still offers, staying at the head of the program until he became the first president of the Provo Temple.

Programs or events

Bachelor of General Studies
The Bachelor of General Studies (BGS) program is an accredited bachelor's degree from BYU, designed to help former students who left the university without completing a degree. The program's motto is "Finish at home what you started at BYU." Students may apply previously earned credit towards their final degree.

Students who are formally accepted into the program complete a BGS degree, with a major in General Studies, and an emphasis in American Studies, English, Family Life, History, Management or Psychology.

BYU FlexGE
Students in the FlexGE program take classes at BYU and participate in campus activities without being admitted to BYU as degree-seeking students.  Completed credits are transferrable to degree-seeking programs at BYU or other universities.  Available class options include evening classes on the Provo campus, classes at the BYU Salt Lake Center, and daytime classes on the Provo campus during spring and summer.  FlexGE students are eligible to live in BYU contracted housing.

Evening classes
Evening classes offered allows students and members of the community to attend BYU classes without formally applying to the university. Classes can be taken to satisfy degree requirements for transfer to another university, or to satisfy educational or career goals.

Education Week
Education Week is a one-week time of lectures in August. Most of the participants are adults, significantly more females than males, who want to augment their personal enrichment or education. However, there are also teenage youth participants with some lectures aimed specifically at teenagers and even dances for the youth. The minimum age for participation is 14. Over 1,000 classes are offered.

The program started in 1922, originally as a leadership week.  It was originally held during the winter to allow for attendance by farmers. In 1950 it moved to the summer and in 1963 the name was changed to Education Week.

In 2009, attendance was around 20,000.

Some Education Week lectures are broadcast over the satellite network owned by the Church of Jesus Christ of Latter-day Saints (LDS Church), while others are shown on BYUtv.

Conferences and workshops
BYU's DCE oversees a range of conferences and workshops. Many of these are short summer programs aimed at improving the skills of specific groups such as adults, professionals, and youth.

BYU Women's Conference
BYU Women's Conference is a two-day conference co-sponsored by the university and the LDS Church's Relief Society organization.  It is open to women and men, ages 16 and older. Both days of the conference begin and end with a general session in the Marriott Center, where all participants meet together.

Between the general sessions there are three one-hour concurrent sessions, with up to 16 sessions to choose from each hour. Topics, centered on the annual theme, include home, family, marriage, service, gospel (scripture, doctrine), and other topics such as missionary work and education—all discussed from a gospel perspective and directed toward women.

Especially for Youth

Especially for Youth is a program run through BYU's DCE for youth ages 14–18 with the goal of helping the central mission statement to "help them come unto Christ".  It seeks to emphasize physical, spiritual, intellectual and social growth.  Although run through BYU and with large numbers of participants at BYU it also occurs at various locations throughout the United States and abroad.  The program is mainly run on university campuses.

Dance camps
BYU Dance Camps offers dance instruction in ballet, ballroom, clogging, ethnic, folk, jazz, modern and tap.  Faculty from BYU's Dance Department, along with guest instructors, direct and teach the Dance Camps. BYU's Dance Department is an accredited institutional member of the National Association of Schools of Dance.

Independent study
The BYU Independent Study program offers over 550 courses. They are grouped under four general course headings: university, high school, middle school, and free. The program is headquartered in the George Q. Morris Center.  BYU Independent Study began in 1921.

BYU's high school level independent study courses are accredited by both the Northwest Accreditation Commission and the Distance Education and Training Council.  The program has been praised as an option for home schooling parents.

In May 2010, the NCAA banned the use of BYU Independent Study high school courses as course credit for students bound for Division I schools.  This was done because Michael Oher had several years earlier used BYU Independent Study courses to boost his grades.  However it was done without consulting BYU on the matter.  After the announcement of disallowance the NCAA said that they wanted courses to have mandated student/teacher interaction and to have a minimum course completion time.  BYU's courses generally have maximum completion times but not minimum ones.

Locations

BYU Conference Center
The BYU Conference Center is located on the northeastern part of campus, and shares a lobby with the Harman Continuing Education Building. The Conference Center is primarily used for university sponsored conferences and events, but is also available for rent by groups outside the university.

BYU Jerusalem Center

The BYU Jerusalem Center is a study abroad center. Students enroll through the BYU campus in Utah, travel to the Holy Land, and live in the center for programs that extend for approximately four months. Students study a core curriculum that focuses on Old and New Testament, ancient and modern Near Eastern studies, and language (Hebrew and Arabic). Classroom study is built around field trips that cover the length and breadth of the Holy Land.

BYU Salt Lake Center
The BYU Salt Lake Center is one of two satellite campuses operated by BYU. Beginning in 1952 lectures and classes were periodically offered by BYU faculty in Salt Lake City.  In January 1959 the BYU Salt Lake Center was formally organized with Lynn M. Hilton as chairman.  It was originally located in the Alfred McCune House, but this proved to be too small for the program.  Other courses were offered at the Craft House, Barrett Hall, the Salt Lake Assembly Hall, the Institute of Religion adjacent to the University of Utah, and many other locations.  In 1972, the Salt Lake Center was relocated to 401 Twelfth Avenue in the former Veteran's Hospital.

Since 2006, the BYU Salt Lake Center has been located in the former Triad Center.

Defunct
The Ricks Center was authorized in July 1956. It was created after Ricks College (now BYU-Idaho) went from being a 4-year college back to being a two-year college. It was formed largely to provide continuing education classes to teachers. J. Kenneth Thatcher, who was the superintendent of the Sugar-Salem School District in Idaho, was hired to organize the center. Besides classes on the Ricks College campus the center also offered classes through its sub-office in Idaho Falls, Idaho.

The BYU-Ogden Center was located in the old Institute of Religion building in Ogden, which was vacated when a new building was set up near the new Weber Junior College (now Weber State University) campus in 1957. In establishing the center, Ernest L. Wilkinson, president of BYU, and Joseph Fielding Smith, chairman of the executive committee of the BYU Board of Trustees, sent a letter in which they emphasized that the institution was geared toward adult continuing education programs and not meant at all to compete with Weber Junior College. Mark A. Benson, a son of Ezra Taft Benson, was appointed as the first director of the Ogden Center when it opened in August 1957.

The BYU-California center was started in 1959, with central offices but most courses given in LDS Church buildings scattered throughout southern California. Until 1969 almost all the courses offered were non-credit classes. Starting in 1959 the center offered an Ed.D. program.

Sources

Ernest L. Wilkinson, ed., Brigham Young University: The First 100 Years. Vol. 2, p. 782-794.  These pages consist of charts that show the historical development of the various BYU colleges and their constituent departments through the end of 1975.

External links
Official website of DCE 
Official website of Bachelor of General Studies
Official website of FlexGE

Division of Continuing Education
Educational institutions established in 1921
University subdivisions in Utah
1921 establishments in Utah